The High Commissioner of Bangladesh to Pakistan is the top diplomatic representative of Bangladesh to Pakistan. The High Commissioner heads the Bangladeshi High Commission in Islamabad.  The post was created on 3 January 1976, shortly after Pakistan and Bangladesh established diplomatic relations. Initially from 1976 to 1989, the Bangladeshi envoy held the rank of ambassador. After Pakistan rejoined the Commonwealth of Nations in 1989, of which Bangladesh was also a member, the post was changed by default to that of the High Commissioner.

The 14th and present High Commissioner is Md. Ruhul Alam Siddique, who assumed responsibilities on 12 October 2020. There is also a Deputy High Commissioner of Bangladesh to Pakistan, who serves as the head of Bangladesh's deputy mission in Karachi.

List of High Commissioners
The following is a list of Bangladeshi envoys to Pakistan along with their tenures:

 Zahiruddin (3 January 1976 – 19 May 1978)
 A.K.M. Nazrul Islam (27 May 1978 – 9 June 1982)
 Quazi Golam Dastgir (19 June 1982 – 1 January 1984)
 Abul Ahsan (16 April 1984 – 22 January 1987)
 C. M. Shafi Sami (28 February 1987 – 5 October 1991)
 M. Anwar Hashim (22 October 1991 – 31 October 1993)
 Q. A. M. A. Rahim (3 November 1993 – 9 August 1998)
 Masum A. Chowdhury (19 August 1998 – 19 September 1999)
 Alimul Haque (4 March 2000 – 2 May 2003)
 F. A. Shamim Ahmed (30 May 2003 – 4 May 2007)
 Yasmeen Murshed (27 December 2007 – 23 November 2009)
 Suhrab Hossain (29 July 2010 – 3 April 2016)
 Tarik Ahsan (8 July 2016 – 26 September 2020)
 Md. Ruhul Alam Siddique (12 October 2020 – present)

See also

 Bangladesh–Pakistan relations
 High Commission of Bangladesh, Islamabad
 Deputy High Commission of Bangladesh, Karachi

References

 
Pakistan
Bangladesh